Marko Janjetović (born 22 April 1984) is a Croatian former football midfielder. He played central and defensive midfielder position.

Club career
Janjetović began playing football for HŠK Zrinjski Mostar. He spent the next several seasons in the Croatian first division playing with NK Hrvatski dragovoljac, NK Inter Zaprešić and NK Međimurje. In August 2008, he joined Russian First League side FC SKA Rostov-on-Don, and would return to the Croatian league after one season in Rostov.

International career
Janjetović has played for Croatia at various youth levels, but has not yet appeared for the senior team.

References

External links
Profile at hns-cff.hr
Profile at HNL-Statistika
Profile at 1hnl.net

1984 births
Living people
Footballers from Zagreb
Association football midfielders
Croatian footballers
Croatia youth international footballers
Croatia under-21 international footballers
NK Hrvatski Dragovoljac players
HŠK Zrinjski Mostar players
NK Inter Zaprešić players
NK Međimurje players
NK Vinogradar players
FC SKA Rostov-on-Don players
Croatian Football League players
First Football League (Croatia) players
Russian First League players
Croatian expatriate footballers
Expatriate footballers in Russia
Croatian expatriate sportspeople in Russia